Sivakasi is a 2005 Indian Tamil-language action dramedy film written and directed by Perarasu. The film stars Vijay in the main lead role, while Asin and Prakash Raj play supporting roles. The film's music is composed by Srikanth Deva, while the background score was composed by his father Deva. The film released on 1 November 2005 during Diwali. The film received positive reviews from the critics, ran for 150 days in theatres and performed commercially well. In 2007, the film was remade in Telugu and Bengali.

Plot
Sivakasi is a welder known for keeping rowdies in check. One day he chastises a jeweler's daughter, Hema, for wearing "skimpy clothing." After she instigates a false case against him, he humiliates her father by declaring his love for her at a wedding. In response, Hema claims he caused her sister's suicide. After fearing arrest and discovering Hema had no sister, he confronts her under the name Vaikasi, during which she declares her love. Doubting her, Sivakasi tells her to spend the night with him, but when she arrives at his house, her brothers take her back home. Fearing her death, Sivakasi recognizes his mistake and ensures her safety. Her father gives his blessing to the match.

Hema's brothers visit and remark that his current income is not enough to support Hema, causing him to throw them out of the house. Hema confronts Sivakasi, remarking he couldn't understand siblings as he was an orphan. Sivakasi reveals his real name, Muthappa, and that he was falsely blamed for setting off crackers near a possessed dancer 15 years earlier, a crime done by his brother Udhayappan. Hema berates him for ignoring his parents' love and declares they will marry only with his family's request.

Sivakasi returns to his village and discovers Udhayappan is now an MLA due to his mother-in-law Moolimungaari's influence. His mother works as a servant in her own house and is unable to recognize him. His sister operates a roadside stall in a nearby village in utter poverty with her husband and child. Sivakasi decides to improve their lot anonymously. One of his few confidants tells how his father died when Udhayappan claimed his mother had affairs. Enraged, Sivakasi beats up Udhayappan and his men, claiming to be the husband of a woman he raped, and is paid 1 million rupees for her false suicide note. The next day, when Udhayappan tries to sell off the ancestral property, Sivakasi reminds the buyers of Muthappa and how, without his signature, the sale is illegal. To avoid this, Udhayappan dresses a false body to look like Muthappa, but Sivakasi inserts a note saying his share of the property should be donated. The note is found valid and Udhayappan reveals his deception.

Later Udhayappan registers his MLA candidacy but finds Vairam contesting, supported by Sivakasi's money. The villagers see Sivakasi as an outsider, but he brings doubles of film stars to canvass for Vairam. Udhayappan brings the real Nayanthara, but Sivakasi makes her unintentionally support Vairam. Udhayappan, furious about Sivakasi, is visited by Hema and Sivakasi's friends who are looking for him.

Udhayappan goes to Sivakasi's house thinking he knows his identity. It is revealed that Hema lied that Muthappa and Sivakasi are friends. He threatens to kill their mother, and although Sivakasi burns his palms, he and Vairam decide to leave. At night, Vairam sees her husband getting kidnapped by someone who she thinks is Udhayappan, although it is Sivakasi in truth. When Vairam confronts her confused elder brother, he hits her, gaining her sympathy votes. Sivakasi fakes a threat by Udhayappan towards Vairam, resulting in Udhayappan's men attacking villagers. The people turn against him and Moolimungari, who is covered in cow dung for making Udhyappan an MLA. She threatens Udhayappan if he fails to be re-elected.

Udhayappan plans to kill his wife and frame Sivakasi to gain votes, but Sivakasi saves her. Sivakasi secretly burns a body with Vairam's husband's chain, making everyone think Udhayappan killed him. The people riot outside his house. Sivakasi calls him, saying he can have Vairam's husband back, but must hand over all ancestral property to her. Udhayappan signs it, thinking Muthappa can't sign, and finds one of his men.

Vairam wins the election and property, and she and her mother regain their old state. Sivakasi releases Vairam's husband and Udhayappan's wife. Udhayappan hears Muthappa has arrived, who is revealed to Vairam and her mother to be Sivakasi. An angry Moolimungari decides to kill Udhayappan, who decides to kill his brother. Moolimungari's men arrive and are about to kill Udhayappan, when their mother asks Muthappa to save him. Sivakasi rescues Udhayappan, who begs forgiveness for his actions and reunites with his wife. Muthappa and Hema are then married.

Cast

Production

After the success of Thirupaachi, A. M. Rathnam called Perarasu to make a film with Vijay re-uniting with him for second time. Sivakasi was Perarasu's second collaboration with Vijay after Thirupaachi and producer Rathnam's third film with Vijay after Kushi (2000) and Ghilli (2004).

Jyothika was reported to be heroine instead role went to Asin. Sridevika was originally offered the role of Vijay's sister but later went to Malayalam actress Lakshana. Simran was initially approached for item number after her rejection, Nayanthara agreed to replace Simran due to the persuasion of Vijay. Geetha was selected to play as Vijay's mother.

Art director G. K. created the sets of T. Nagar with the sum of Rs. 12.0 million, one of the traditional Mylapore look complete with tall temple gopurams and Teppakulam and another of vintage Triplicane aura with mosques. There were reports that Vijay would perform dual roles but later proved false.  feet of rolls has been used to shoot the film. The first schedule was completed in Chennai and the crew camped at Karaikudi for the second schedule, the third schedule was shot at Kushaldas Gardens with Vijay and Asin. Rocky Rajesh was doing the Stunt Master's job for Vijay's film Sivakasi. As Dharani wanted Rocky Rajesh to work for his Telugu film, he requested the director of Sivakasi, Perarasu to release him. Hence the climactic fight sequences were composed and finished in a short time by  Thalapathy Dinesh of Chandramuki fame. Dubbing was held at Kalasa studios.

Music

The soundtrack was composed by Srikanth Deva. But Srikanth Deva was only able to composed the songs as he was composing for his ongoing project, Aacharya. Hence, the background score was composed by his father, Deva. All lyrics were penned by Perarasu. The song “Ada Ennaatha” is partially inspired by the song “Andhamaina Bhamalu” from the Telugu film Manmadhudu.

Release & reception

The film released on 1 November 2005. The satellite rights of the film were secured by Jaya TV. The film was given a U certificate by the Censor Board, with "three dialogue cuts".

Ananda Vikatan rated the film 42 out of 100. Indiaglitz wrote: "Sivakasi is one among the long line of formulaic masala mass entertainers that Vijay is now known to dish out. In Perarasu, Vijay has got a director who understands the hero as well as his fans". Behindwoods wrote: "The movie is worth seeing as it includes sentiment and entertainment. It is an action paired entertainer and worth considering". Sify wrote: "This FORMULA had worked well for director Perarasu and Vijay in Tirupachi and now the team has re-worked it. This time, however, it will test your patience as it is not meant for the class audience or those seeking quality entertainment. Perarasu and Vijay believe only in catering to the mass audience who want their dose of unpretentious masala mix". The Film ran 150 Days in Theatres.

Remakes
Sivakasi was remade into Telugu as Vijayadasami in the year 2007. It was also remade into Bengali as Aamar Pratigya in the year 2008. And Remade in Bhojpuri as Karz Virasat ke in the year 2015.

References

External links 
 

Indian action films
2005 films
Films directed by Perarasu
2000s masala films
Tamil films remade in other languages
2000s Tamil-language films
Films scored by Srikanth Deva
2005 action films